Vuk Vidor (born 1965) is a French-Serbian artist.

Life 
Vuk Vidor is the son of the painter, illustrator and engraver Vladimir Veličković and the older brother of artist Marko Velk. Born in Belgrade, Serbia in 1965, he studied architecture at the Ecole Nationale des Beaux Arts de Paris-Tolbiac (Paris-Tolbiac National School of Fine Arts) and graduated in 1990. He shows several of his utopian and conceptual architectural projects alongside pioneers such as Zaha Hadid, Morphosis, Coop Himmelblau, Eric Moss... In 1992, Vuk Vidor decides to turn to painting. A series of drawing he started in 1989 and entitled " King Ink " often serves as the basis for his works.

Work

Artistic practice 
Vidor's work is characterized by its eclecticism. His reflexion about life and death is prominent in a series of paintings entitled " Ascendance " that depicts interconnected skulls. It is a way to represent emotional, historical or even cosmic connexions between beings. His works are full of irony. The " Everlast " series is about the 4 ages of life : childhood, Adulthood, old age and death. He works with several mediums, mostly painting and drawing, but sometimes sculpture or installation as well. In 2000 he contributed to an exhibition about the color red, symbolizing eros, blood and violence.

In 2015, Vuk Vidor created an exhibition around a fictitious industrial and scientist, Thomas Jerome Newton, a character from the 1976 movie The Man Who Fell to Earth. He built a story around the character, pretending that he was about to give an interview to Time Magazine. He feigned to have had access to the character's archives and exhibited documents about him. David Bowie, who impersonates Thomas Jerome Newton in the movie, is omnipresent in the exhibition. Vuk Vidor had previously focused on another icon, the singer and musician Elvis Presley, whose name he had changed to ‘Evils’.

Vuk Vidor has worked with musicians Goran Bregović and Marc Cerrone, and English rock band Duran Duran. He directed numerous music clips in Serbia in the 90s. In 2006, he directed a vido clip about greed for the launch of the Chrysler 300.

Committed art 
Vuk Vidor is a committed and political artist. In 2003 he takes side for the Refugees in an installation called Serbia Remix Project. The subject of the installation is a blue, white, and red striped plastic bag. This bag is according to him, a common feature of every victim of modern conflicts. His work is fraught with historical references and frequently deals with the idea of war. He has built a gold statue of himself in an attempt to reflect both on his ego as an artist. and on Serbian nationalism.

In a 2009 series entitled " American Quartet ", he delivers his own vision of the United States. Through figures of weary Superheroes, he denounces the myth of the Frontier and the omnipotence of the US. Captain American becomes an Atlas-like figure, bearing on his shoulder not the world but the American Dream. Jesus is also part of the exhibition, but is shown crucified to Shareholders. The inspiration of his post 9/11 world comes from pop art and American comics – a genre he likes to parody. He twists American symbols and turns heroes into useless villains. He exhibits his works in the United States to force Americans to face their contradictions. He intends to show that today " even super-heroes cannot save us ". Generally speaking, his work constantly interrogates the place of humanity in the universe.

Conception of art 
Vuk Vidor's vision of art is sometimes controversial. " Vuillard was better than Bonnard, same for Tapiès, Rauschenberg used to be better, Twombly has always painted crap, Bacon was better when he was alive. ", he said in a 1999 manifesto-like work entitled " Art history ". In 2007 he co-signed an editorial in the French newspaper L’Humanité, criticizing how the French Ministry for Culture was contributing to create a normalized and monopolistic " official art ". He spoke against the " masked puppeteers " who are imposing diktats of fashion and trends in the art world. He asked for a fair repartition of temporary exhibition spaces. His work is transgressive : he even directed erotic videos.

In 2012, Vuk Vidor created the under-realist movement with Kosta Kulundzic, a Franco-American artist of Serbian origin, and the French artist Stéphane Pencréac’h. The movement is a reaction against the over-conceptualisation of contemporary painting. For them, the image is more important than the idea. The under-realism is a grouping of artists who share the same vision of the artist's condition and are trying to free themselves from the diktats of market and trends.

Recognition 
Vuk Vidor was awarded the Ito Ham Prize in 1986.

He was awarded the International Painting Prize of Vitry-sur-Seine in 1996.

Exhibitions

Solo shows 

 2013
Newton, Poulsen Gallery, Copenhagen
 Les 7 péchés capitaux, Mazel Gallery, Brussels
 2009 : Superheroe, Magda Danysz Gallery, Paris
 2007 : Even Super Heroes Can't Save Us Now, Cueto Project, New York City
 2006 :
 If you’re looking for trouble you came to the right place, Valérie Cueto Gallery, Paris
 The Blood Value of the Banana, Palais de Tokyo, Paris
 2005
 If you’re looking for trouble you came to the right place, Art Basel Miami Beach, United States
 If you’re looking for trouble you came to the right place, ARCO 05, Madrid
 2004
Eldorado, Valérie Cueto Gallery, Paris
 If you are looking for trouble you came to the right place, CZKD, Belgrade
 Art history, mural installation, Palais de Tokyo, Paris
 2003
Flesh for Fantasy, Valérie Cueto Gallery, Paris
 Flesh for Fantasy, Emmanuel Javogue Fine Art, Miami
 2001 : Serbia Remix, Belgrade
 1999 :
 (L)overs, Valérie Cueto Gallery, Paris
 Last Painting of the Century, Valérie Cueto Gallery, Paris
 Last Painting of the Century, Picture Show Gallery, Berlin
 1995
 Give me back my flag, CZKD, Belgrade
 Museum of Modern Art, Kragujevac, Yugoslavia
 Galerie 12 +, Belgrade

Group shows 
 2018 : Action ! La Nouvelle École française : première époque, Bastille Design Center, Paris
 2015 : Blackout, Mazel Gallery, Brussels
 2014
 St’Art Art Fair, Mazel Gallery, Strasbourg
 Sur le papier, Mazel Gallery, Brussels
 2013
 Drawing Now, Carrousel du Louvre, Paris
 Under Realism 3, La Lune en parachute, Epinal, France
 Under Realism v. 4.0, Acentmètresducentredumonde, Perpignan, France
 SOON, Mazel Galerie, Brussels
 2012
 Louise Alexander Gallery, Porto Cervo, Italy
 Art Paris, Louise Alexander Gallery, Paris
 Quelques instants plus tard… Art & Bande dessinée, Réfectoire des Cordeliers, Paris
 The Gallery Poulsen Late Summer Show 2012, Poulsen Gallery, Copenhagen
 Une histoire vraie. Leopold Rabus & Guests, Aeroplastics Gallery, Brussels
 Happy Birthday Marilyn… 50 ans déjà, Mazel Gallery, Brussels
 Under Realism 1, Serbia Cultural Center, Paris
 Under Realism 2, Progres Gallery, Belgrade
 Tensions, Mazel Gallery, Brussels
 2011 : Words and dreams. Where technology meets dreams and vice versa, 18Gallery Shanghai – Bund 18, Shanghai
 2010
 Vuk Vidor and Friends, Poulsen Gallery, Copenhagen
 The Poulsen X-Mas Show 2010, Poulsen Gallery, Copenhagen
 Speed Painting, Magda Danysz Gallery, Paris
 2009
 Vraoum !, Maison Rouge, Paris
 That's all Folks!, Stadshallen, Bruges, Belgium
 Elusive Dreams 2, Irish Museum of Contemporary Art, Dublin
 2008 : Micro-Narratives: Temptation of Small Realities, Saint-Étienne Metropolis Museum of Modern Art, Saint-Étienne, France
 2007
Micro Narratives, 45th October Salon, Belgrade
 The Theatre of Cruelty, White Box, New York
 Zeitgeist, Cueto Project, New York
 Superego, CZKD, Belgrade
 French Touche, Villa Tamaris, La Seyne-sur-Mer, France
 2006 : Faites de beaux rêves, Nuit Blanche, Paris
 2005
 Artists & Arms, Maars Gallery, Moscow
 Exposition inaugurale, Marta Herford, Herford, Germany
 Art Cologne, Cologne, Germany
 Foire internationale d'art contemporain, Paris
 Art Brussels, Brussels
 Cosmopolis, Muséum of Contemporary Art of Thessaloniki, Thessaloniki, Greece
 My Favorite Things: Peinture en France, Contemporary Art Museum, Lyon
 2004
Comic Release: Negotiating Identity for a New Generation, Regina Gouger Miller Gallery, Carnegie-Mellon University, Pittsburgh, United States
 Comic Release: Negotiating Identity for a New Generation, University of Arizona Museum of Art, Tucson, United States
 Comic Release: Negotiating Identity for a New Generation, Armory Center for the Arts, Pasadena, United States
 Comic Release: Negotiating Identity for a New Generation, Art House, Austin, United States
 Comic Release: Negotiating Identity for a New Generation, Western Washington University, Bellingham, United States
 Comic Release: Negotiating Identity for a New Generation, Art Brussels, Brussels
 Comic Release: Negotiating Identity for a New Generation, Foire internationale d'art contemporain, Paris
 2003
 Central, Galerie Ernst Hilger, Belgrade
 Comic Release: Negotiating Identity for a New Generation, The Contemporary Museum, Honolulu, Hawaii, United States
 Comic Release: Negotiating Identity for a New Generation, The Naples Museum of Art, Naples (Florida), United States
 Comic Release: Negotiating Identity for a New Generation, Real Area Ways, Hartford, United States
 Comic Release: Negotiating Identity for a New Generation, Austin Museum of Art, Austin, United States
 Comic Release: Negotiating Identity for a New Generation, Université Carnegie-Mellon, Pittsburgh, United States
 Comic Release: Negotiating Identity for a New Generation, Contemporary Arts Center, New Orleans, United States
 Comic Release: Negotiating Identity for a New Generation, North Texas University, United States
 Black Box, Palais de Tokyo, Paris
 Scope Art Fair, New York
 2002 : Supercellular ! De la Particule dans les Arts Plastiques au début du XXIème siècle, Valérie Cueto Gallery, Paris – Chicago – Madrid – Miami – Turin
 2000 : L'Autre Europe n°2, Jeu de Paume Gallery, Paris
 1997
 Vitry-sur-Seine City Gallery, Vitry-sur-Seine, France
 Transformers, CZKD, Belgrade
 1996
 Nova Gallery, Ibiza, Spain
 Un cadeau unique, Lucien Durand Gallery, Paris
 November in Vitry, Vitry-sur-Seine, France
 1995 : Image pour Sarajevo, Le Sous-Sol Gallery, Paris
 1994
 Salon de Montrouge
 L’art au marché, Paris
 1993
 Découverte, Philippe Uzan Gallery, Paris
 Salon de Mai, Grand Palais, Paris
 Falling astronauts, Louvain-la-Neuve and Antwerp, Belgium

References 

1965 births
Living people
Artists from Belgrade
Serbian painters
20th-century French painters
French people of Serbian descent
21st-century French painters
Serbian emigrants to France